This is an alphabetical listing of songs recorded by singer Jennifer Rush.

The earliest songs listed are from 1979 when she recorded songs under her birth name Heidi Stern. She later changed her stage name to Jennifer Rush in 1983. Jennifer's discography includes 11 studio albums (including her 1979 album Heidi) as well numerous non-LP tracks and collaborations. Jennifer has also co-written many songs in her career, particularly on her first two 1980s albums.

Most of Jennifer's songs are recorded in English, but occasionally she re-recorded songs in Spanish and has also recorded songs written in German and Hungarian.

Songs

Notes

References

Lists of songs recorded by American artists